The UAE Futsal League, is the top league for futsal in the United Arab Emirates. The winning team obtains the participation right to the AFC Futsal Club Championship.

Champions 

 2020/2021: Al Dhafra FC (futsal)
 2019/2020: Batayeh
 2018/2019: Al Ahli
 2017/2018: Al Dhafrah
 2016/2017: Al Dhafrah
 2015/2016: Al Ahli
 2014/2015: Al Wahda
 2013/2014: Al Khaleej
 2012/2013: Al Wasl
 2011/2012: Al Wasl
 2010/2011: Al Wasl
 2009/2010: Al Wasl

See also 

 AFC Futsal club championship
 United Arab Emirates Football Association
 Tajik futsal 
 Official page on Facebook
 United Arab Emirates national futsal team

References

Futsal in the United Arab Emirates